The 1984 Senior League World Series took place from August 13–18 in Gary, Indiana, United States. Altamonte Springs, Florida defeated Pingtung, Taiwan in the championship game.

Teams

Results

References

Senior League World Series
Senior League World Series
1984 in sports in Indiana